Nogometni klub Beltinci, commonly referred to as NK Beltinci or simply Beltinci, was a Slovenian football club which played in the town of Beltinci. The club was founded in 1949 and dissolved during the early 2000s, when they were unable to obtain competition licences issued by the Football Association of Slovenia. During their history, the club has played a total of nine season in the Slovenian top division, Slovenian PrvaLiga.

A successor club which claims the rights to Beltinci's honours and records was established in July 2006 under the name Nogometno društvo Žuti Marki, later renamed to ND Beltinci. However, legally the two clubs' track records and honours are kept separate by the Football Association of Slovenia.

League history since 1991

References

Association football clubs established in 1949
1949 establishments in Slovenia
2006 disestablishments in Slovenia
Defunct football clubs in Slovenia
Association football clubs disestablished in 2006